Kottmar is a municipality in the district of Görlitz, in Saxony, Germany, created with effect from 1 January 2013 by the merger of the municipalities of Eibau, Niedercunnersdorf and Obercunnersdorf. Its name derives from the Kottmar mountain (583 m).

References 

Municipalities in Saxony
Populated places in Görlitz (district)